Banbáin Os Cach, Lector of Kildare, died 686.

The Annals of Tigernach record his death, sub anno 686: Mors Banbain Os Cach sapientis, fer légind Cilli Dara. His nickname means wise above everyone, rendered as sapienties in Latin.

References

External links
 http://www.ucc.ie/celt/published/G100002/index.html

7th-century Irish people
People from County Kildare
686 deaths